Kennedy Ombima (born 7 May 1987), better known by his stage names King Kaka and Rabbit, is a Kenyan rapper. Kaka met Jorma Taccone, a member of The Lonely Island in February 2011 when Taccone visited Nairobi, Kenya as part of his trip for AFAR Magazine's "Spin the Globe". Sungura collaborated with Taccone to create a rap video that has over 1.2 million views. Taccone later wrote an article for AFAR Magazine documenting the experience with Sungura. In 2012, Rabbit launched his own clothing line dubbed Niko Kwa Jam Nakam.

With his 17-track album Tales of Kaka Sungura Sunguuch already out, Kaka stated that he was solely focused on promoting the album as well as shooting a few videos: I cannot do another album until late next year. I give my all when I compile an album, that's why I won't rush into another album project." In November 2012, he released a music video for his song "Adisia".

Apart from his successful music career, Kaka is also a businessman and in early September 2015 he launched his purified water company known as Kaka Empire's Majik Water using his music brand name as the official name of the product.

Personal life
He is married to Nana Owiti, with whom he has two children.

References

Kenyan rappers
1987 births
Living people
People from Nairobi